"Holding On" is a ballad by British singer Beverley Craven. The song was released as the album's fourth single in late 1990. This was Craven's first entry in the UK charts, peaking at a low #95 in February 1991. After the success of "Promise Me" in May 1991, "Holding On" was re-released as the follow-up single in July 1991, peaking at #32. The song also hit some European charts, and was also Craven's sole chart entry in the USA charts.

"Holding On" was one of three songs Craven recorded first with producer Stewart Levine in America. Not liking the final result, she went on to work with Paul Samwell-Smith, who produced her debut album. Levine's productions of her songs, however, were released as b-sides to her singles, under the label "West Coast Version".

Charts 

1991 singles
1990s ballads
Beverley Craven songs
Song recordings produced by Paul Samwell-Smith
1990 songs
Epic Records singles
Songs written by Beverley Craven